The Botswana cricket team toured Namibia in August 2019 to play a four-match Twenty20 International (T20I) series. The series was the first bilateral T20I series hosted in the country and provided Namibia with preparation for the 2019 ICC T20 World Cup Qualifier. The teams also played two friendly 50-over matches either side of the T20I series.

Squads

50-over series

1st 50-over match

2nd 50-over match

T20I series

1st T20I

2nd T20I

3rd T20I

4th T20I

References

External links
 Series home at ESPN Cricinfo

Associate international cricket competitions in 2019